The World Group was the highest level of competition in the 2000 Fed Cup.  This year, the World Group and World Group II merged to become one group, with one more team joining the Group from last year's World Group II Play-offs. Twelve teams were put into three pools of four teams each, with the winner of each pool joining defending champions the United States in a four-team play-off.

The defending champions claimed their record seventeenth and most recent title, defeating five-time champions Spain in the final.

Participating Teams

Pools

Pool A
Venue: Bari T.C., Bari, Italy (outdoor clay)

Date: 27–30 April

Pool B
Venue: Incheba Hall, Bratislava, Slovakia (indoor hard)

Date: 27–30 April

Pool C
Venue: Olympic Stadium, Moscow, Russia (indoor carpet)

Date: 27–30 April

Knockout stage

Venue: Mandalay Bay Events Center, Las Vegas, NV, United States (supreme carpet, indoor)

Date: 21–25 November

See also
Fed Cup structure

 
World Group